Hakea arborescens, commonly known as the common hakea or the yellow hakea, is a shrub or tree of the genus Hakea native to parts of northern Australia.

Description
The bark on the trunk and larger branches is rough, fissured and grey in colour. It blooms from January to July and produce yellow-cream flowers. It has a free, silvery to rusty coloured perianth and a conical pollen presenter.

Taxonomy
Hakea arborescens was first formally described by botanist Robert Brown in 1810 as part of the work On the natural order of plants called Proteaceae as published in Transactions of the Linnean Society of London. The specific epithet (arborescens) is derived from the Latin  meaning  "becoming tree-like" referring to the habit of the shrub.

Distribution
Hakea arborescens is  endemic to the top end in the Northern Territory, the Kimberley region of Western Australia and northern Queensland. It is often found among coastal dunes, inland on soils that are alkaline, along creek banks or in low-lying areas such as swamps. Hakea arborescens  is often found growing over and around areas of sandstone, quartzite and limestone and usually part of monsoon forest or Eucalyptus woodland communities.

References

arborescens
Eudicots of Western Australia
Plants described in 1810
Taxa named by Robert Brown (botanist, born 1773)